The Haunted House of Horror, also titled Horror House and The Dark, is a 1969 British horror film directed by Michael Armstrong and starring Frankie Avalon and Jill Haworth as young adults looking for a thrill by spending the night in an old mansion in the English countryside. The film's tagline was "Behind its forbidden doors an evil secret hides!"

Plot
In swinging London, a group of twenty-something friends are attending a rather dull party, and they decide to gather for kicks at an old, supposedly haunted mansion where one of their number used to play as a child. Among the group is American ringleader Chris, his bored girlfriend Sheila, promiscuous Sylvia (who has her eye on handsome two-timing Gary) and his "good girl" date, Dorothy. Also tagging along are nervous, heavy-set Madge, her sarcastic, hot-tempered boyfriend Peter, sweet-faced Richard and his friend Henry. They are all followed by Paul Kellet, Sylvia's older, jealous and married ex-boyfriend.

They have fun exploring the mansion, even holding a séance before separating one by one by candlelight on the moonlit night. Sylvia, frightened by the mansion, leaves and hitchhikes toward home, but Kellet hangs behind at the mansion. While all the partiers are alone, Gary is brutally knifed and his body is discovered by the panic-stricken Dorothy and the others. Because some of them have a criminal record, Chris convinces the group to leave Gary's body far from the home and to pretend that Gary left and that no one knows where he went. They are all shaken by Chris' assertion that one of them must be the murderer.

During the next few weeks, the survivors are possessed by tension and guilt, and after Gary is reported missing, they are further shaken by questioning from the police. Kellet confronts Sylvia, learning that she may have lost a lighter that could link them to the mansion. He returns there but is also killed.

Dorothy calls the survivors together to ask to confess. However, Chris convinces them to return to the house to discover who among them is the killer before they all succumb to a gruesome death. Meanwhile, Sylvia is visited by the police again, and she discloses the location of the house after learning of Kellet's disappearance. At the mansion, Dorothy becomes hysterical, prompting several of the group to depart, leaving just Chris, Sheila and Richard. While Sheila is out of the room, Richard recounts how he was locked in a basement for three days as a child and tells that he has a paralyzing fear of the dark. Despite Chris' efforts, he is also knifed and Sheila is frantically chased around the mansion. Just as Richard is about to strike, the moon goes behind a cloud, bringing about his reversion to childhood and fear of the dark, thus saving Sheila as the police arrive.

Cast
Frankie Avalon as Chris
Jill Haworth as Sheila
Dennis Price as Inspector
Mark Wynter as Gary
George Sewell as Kellett
Gina Warwick as Sylvia
Richard O'Sullivan as Peter
Carol Dilworth as Dorothy
Julian Barnes as Richard
Veronica Doran as Madge
Robin Stewart as Henry
Jan Holden as Peggy
Clifford Earl as Police Sergeant
Robert Raglan as Bradley
Nicholas Young as Party Guest

Production
Michael Armstrong wrote the screenplay, originally entitled The Dark, in 1960 at the age of 15. He rewrote the script in 1967, "further developing its darker psycho-sexual themes and sharpening characters and dialogue to reflect the current cynical underbelly beneath the superficial Sixties culture." He also added the character of Richard, to be played by David Bowie. Armstrong showed it to John Trevelyan, who recommended it to Tony Tenser of Tigon Films. Tenser set up the film with American International Pictures (AIP), which wanted it made in England, where it was cheaper to film than in the U.S.

AIP insisted that a role be written for Boris Karloff, so Armstrong created the role of a detective who used a wheelchair. However, Karloff was too ill to play the part and Dennis Price took the role instead. AIP also insisted that the two lead characters be played by American actors and that more sex scenes should be added.

Armstrong wanted the lead role of Chris to be played by Ian Ogilvy. However, AIP insisted that either Fabian or Frankie Avalon, both of whom were under contract to AIP, play the part. Armstrong wanted Jane Merrow to play the female lead, but Louis Hewyard of AIP wanted Sue Lyon or Carol Lynley. Jill Haworth was eventually cast. Armstrong originally wrote the part of Richard for Peter McEnery but later rewrote it for David Bowie; he was so keen on Bowie that he wrote a number of cabaret scenes in early drafts specifically for him. However, once Avalon was cast, it was feared that Bowie would clash with him. Bowie was replaced by Noel Janus, but objections led to him being replaced with Julian Barnes (who had originally been cast as Henry).

Heyward wrote additional scenes for the film, to the dismay of Armstrong. Tenser tried to arrange for both Armstrong's and Heyward's versions to be made, but there was not enough money, so a fourth draft was written that cobbled together all the drafts.

Shooting
Some exterior scenes where shot at Bank Hall in Bretherton. The interior scenes where shot at the Birkdale Palace Hotel, Southport.

Sam Arkoff and James Nicholson of AIP hated the original cut that included Heyward's scenes and requested new scenes. Armstrong wrote the new scenes and handed them to line producer Gerry Levy, but Levy ignored Armstrong's scenes and wrote his own additional material, including a romance between Gina Warwick and a new character played by George Sewell. Levy also added two additional killings, a musical number in the opening scene and a revised closing exposition.

Armstrong says that among the scenes missing in the final cut of the film were a love story between Gary and Sylvia, "twisted sexual meanderings of the characters," satire of the youth scene and a homosexual subplot.

Filming locations
Bank Hall, Bretherton, Lancashire, England, UK;
Birkdale Palace Hotel, Southport, Merseyside, England, UK;
Carnaby Street, Soho, London, England, UK;
Grim's Dyke, Harrow, England, UK. (Some scenes reshot)

Reception
Howard Thompson of The New York Times called the film an "atrocious hack-'em-up bundle." Variety wrote, "As long as he stays in the house, director Michael Armstrong keeps things tense and scary enough, but things look a little silly in the daylight ... All the tension dissipates when the knife-wielding maniac proves just another mixed-up kid rather than anything really spooky. At that, a ghost might have been more believable than Barnes' big scene at the end." Kevin Thomas of the Los Angeles Times reviewed the film jointly with The Crimson Cult and found them both to be "enjoyable British horror pictures ... that transcend their formula plots through exceptional scripting, efficient direction and intelligent performances." The Monthly Film Bulletin wrote that the story "strains credulity even for a thriller and is elongated to breaking point," concluding, "The shock sequences are reasonably well contrived and there is a liberal flow of blood, but this haunted house is more likely to induce sleep than nightmare."

The film's box-office performance was reasonable.

References

External links
 
 The Haunted House of Horror at TCMDB

British horror films
British slasher films
1969 films
1969 horror films
Films directed by Michael Armstrong
Films set in country houses
Films shot in Lancashire
Films shot in Merseyside
1970s English-language films
1960s English-language films
1960s British films
1970s British films